Caney may refer to:

Places
In the United States:
 Caney, Kansas
 Caney, Kentucky
 Pippa Passes, Kentucky, known to its inhabitants as Caney or Caney Creek
 Caney, Oklahoma, in Atoka County
 Caney, Cherokee County, Oklahoma

In Cuba:
 El Caney

See also
 Caney Creek (disambiguation)